Twang!! is a musical with music and lyrics written by Lionel Bart and a book by Bart and Harvey Orkin, with assistance from Burt Shevelove. The piece, a spoof of the character and legend of Robin Hood, was a disastrous box-office failure and cost Bart his personal fortune.

After a preview in Manchester, Twang!! opened at the Shaftesbury Theatre in London's West End on 20 December 1965 and closed on 29 January 1966 after just 43 performances, receiving scathing reviews and playing to mostly empty houses.  Bart produced it with Bernard Delfont and John Bryan, and Joan Littlewood directed but quit before it opened.  She was replaced by Shevelove and Bart. Twang!! is remembered as "the most expensive flop" in West End history up to that time.

In 2008, the Estate of Lionel Bart commissioned Julian Woolford to write a new book for the musical which was performed in 2013 at Guildford School of Acting. This version is now licensed through MTI

Synopsis
Robin Hood and his Merry Men attempt to break into Nottingham Castle, in a variety of preposterous disguises, in order to prevent a marriage between the nymphomaniac "court tart" Delphina and the hairy Scots laird Roger the Ugly, arranged for the purpose of securing the loan of Scottish troops for bad Prince John.

The new version is a "meta-musical" with a completely different plot. Robin Hood has lost his 'Twang' and is not the hero he once was. Much the Miller's Son arrives in Sherwood Forest having run away from home and is arrested by the sheriff. He is rescued by Robin and the Men before discovering that in Nottinghamshire life is a musical comedy. He falls in love with Delphina whilst Maid Marion helps Robin find his missing 'twang' before King Richard returns to re-establish order.

Roles and principal cast
Alan-a-Dale – Elric Hooper
Sir Guy of Gisborne  – Howard Goorney
Mystery Voice in "Unseen Hands"  – Long John Baldry
Mutch – Kent Baker
Robin Hood  – James Booth
Little John  – Bernard Bresslaw
Will Scarlett  – Ronnie Corbett
Friar Tuck  – Will Stampe
Sheriff of Nottingham  – Bob Grant
Maid Marian  – Toni Eden
Prince John  – Maxwell Shaw
Delphina  – Barbara Windsor
Roger the Ugly  – Philip Newman

Production
The cast included the strongest players from Littlewood's Theatre Workshop, including Ronnie Corbett, Barbara Windsor and James Booth.  But Twang!! ran into difficulty from the start. The script was weak, especially the part of Robin Hood, which was badly underwritten. When Booth expressed his concerns, he was repeatedly assured that the part would be expanded to a starring role. Littlewood demanded a rewrite, but constant, confusing revisions failed to improve the script. Littlewood, the choreographer Paddy Stone, the designer Oliver Messel, and the writers failed to work together. Rehearsals were disorganised and fraught with tension; Bart was drinking; Littlewood threatened to walk out. At a rehearsal, Littlewood accused Bart of failing to fulfill his creative responsibilities because he was too strung-out on LSD. Bart, in turn, accused Littlewood of ruining the piece.

A Birmingham tryout was scheduled and cancelled. A Manchester preview opened on 3 November 1965 at the Palace Theatre with a script that was unfinished. Word of the disaster leaked to the tabloids. Littlewood quit the company, and a script doctor, American Burt Shevelove, was brought in to fix the script and score, leading to more confusing changes, but nothing helped. The scenes had no relation to the songs, and Twang!! transferred to London preceded by continued bad press. The show opened in disarray at London's Shaftesbury Theatre on 20 December 1965. Still, Bart thought he could save the show. On opening night, the musical director, Ken Moule, collapsed of exhaustion and still had failed to orchestrate the second act. Two songs were cut in the hours before the curtain rose, and the piece was played for camp, even adding some transvestism. The house lights kept going up and down throughout the performance, and vicious arguments were overheard backstage. Twang!! garnered scornful and derisive reviews. The critics noted the lack of heroics and the pseudo-pantomime delivery, although there were some effective musical sequences, including a scene around a gallows that became a morris dance around a maypole. Windsor also came in for some praise.

The show had been intended as a romp that poked fun at the Crusades, the attitude of the Church and the human flaw of wanting to turn an outlaw into a hero. Orkin believed the show failed because they failed to establish the exact butt of that satire; it was too vague and inconsequential. Bart lost his personal fortune in Twang!! and was devastated by the failure of the show. So was Booth, who made no money for a year while preparing for it. For Ronnie Corbett, however, the failure of Twang!! was a lucky break – it meant he was free to participate in The Frost Report, his breakthrough in television, and also the show where he first worked with Ronnie Barker.

When revived at the Union Theatre, London in 2018, the musical received some positive reviews. It was dubbed "a meta-musical with bags of heart" by The Stage.

Songs

Act I
May a Man Be Merry – Alan-a-Dale
Welcome to Sherwood Forest – Robin, Mutch, Little John, Will, Friar Tuck, Alan-a-Dale
Wander – Robin, Marian
What Makes a Star? – Prince John, Heralds and Company
Make an Honest Woman [of Me] – Delphina, Crusaders' Wives
Roger the Ugly – Prince John, Sir Guy, Sheriff
To the Woods – Marian, Delphina
Dreamchild – Marian
With Bells On – Robin and Company
Sighs – Little John, Delphina, Alan-a-Dale
You Can't Catch Me! – Robin, Marian

Act II
Living a Legend – Robin
Unseen Hands – Mystery Voice
Writing on the Wall – Delphina
Wander (reprise) – Marian, Robin
Roger the Ugly (reprise) – Prince John, Sir Guy, Sheriff, Sir Roger
Whose Little Girl Are You? – Delphina
Follow the Leader – Little John, Will, Alan-a-Dale, Mutch, Friar Tuck
I'll Be Hanged – Robin, Company
Tan-Ta-Ra! – Robin, Marian, Company

A cast album, produced by George Martin, was recorded and released in 1966 on the United Artists Records label on LP (no. ULP 1116). It was re-released in 1987 on the TER label (no. 1055) on LP and cassette. A CD-R pressing was sold in the U.S. exclusively through the online reseller Footlight in 2011. The recording includes a track called "Twang!!" at the beginning of side B.

Notes

References
Roper, David (1994). Bart! The Unauthorized Life & Times, Ins and Outs, Ups and Downs of Lionel Bart, Pavilion Books Ltd.
Corbett, Ronnie; David Nobbs (2006). And it's goodnight from him... The Autobiography of The Two Ronnies. London: Penguin. .  
Parker, Derek & Julia (1979). The Story & The Song. Chappell & Co.

External links
Twang!! at Theatricalia
Twang!! at the Guide to Musical Theatre

West End musicals
1965 musicals
Robin Hood parodies